The Dark Pictures: Switchback VR is a rail shooter video game developed and published by Supermassive Games for the PlayStation VR2. It was released on 16 March 2023. It is a spin-off of The Dark Pictures Anthology and features the player riding a horror-themed roller coaster.

It is a spiritual sequel to the 2016 VR game Until Dawn: Rush of Blood, which was also a launch game near the original PlayStation VR’s release.

Gameplay
The game is a spin-off from The Dark Pictures Anthology and features various locations from the four games of its first season.

Development
In February 2022, Supermassive Games filed trademarks for six potential future entries, including Switchback. Unlike previous entries of the series, it is not published by Bandai Namco Entertainment, instead being self-published by Supermassive Games. The game was originally planned to release alongside the PlayStation VR2 headset on 22 February 2023, but Supermassive Games announced in January 2023 that the game's release would be delayed until 16 March 2023.

References

External links

2023 video games
Horror video games
Rail shooters
Roller coaster games and simulations
Virtual reality games
Single-player video games
Supermassive Games
Video games developed in the United Kingdom
Video game spin-offs
PlayStation VR2 games
PlayStation 5-only games